Angel Eyes: Ballads & Slow Jams is a 1996 album by the American jazz organist Jimmy Smith. The album was Smith's penultimate album, and his last recording for five years.

On the Billboard Top Jazz Album charts Angel Eyes: Ballads & Slow Jams peaked at number 22.

Reception

The Allmusic review by Scott Yanow awarded the album three stars and wrote that "Despite the constant changing of instrumentation, the results (although pleasant) are uneventful and somewhat predictable. Good for late-night background music rather than for close listening."

Track listing
 "Stolen Moments" (Oliver Nelson) - 7:00
 "You Better Go Now" (Robert Graham, Bickley S. Reichmer) - 5:15
 "Angel Eyes" (Earl Brent, Matt Dennis) - 8:00
 "Oh Bess, Oh Where's My Bess?" (George Gershwin, Ira Gershwin, DuBose Heyward) - 4:10	
 "Slow Freight" (Lupin Fein, Irving Mills, Buck Ram) - 5:52 	
 "Tenderly" (Walter Gross, Jack Lawrence) - 6:25 	
 "Days of Wine and Roses" (Henry Mancini, Johnny Mercer) - 7:00 	
 "Li'l Darlin'" (Neal Hefti) - 6:15
 "What a Wonderful World" (Bob Thiele, George David Weiss) - 4:25

Personnel
Jimmy Smith – organ, arranger
Roy Hargrove – flugelhorn, trumpet
Nicholas Payton – trumpet
Mark Whitfield – guitar
Christian McBride – double bass
Damon Krukowski – drums, percussion
Gregory Hutchinson – drums
Production
Richard Seidel – liner notes, producer
Allan Tucker – mastering
Chris Albert – mixing assistant
Jimmy Katz – photography
James Minchin
Don Sickler – producer
Camille Tominaro – production coordinator
Jim Anderson - engineer, mixing
Giulio Turturro – art direction, design
Scott Austin – assistant engineer

References

1996 albums
Jimmy Smith (musician) albums
Verve Records albums